Jeffrey Eric Stanton aka SIX TIME (born June 18, 1968) is an American former professional motocross racer. He competed in the AMA Motocross Championships from 1988 to 1999. He is a three-time AMA 250cc Motocross and Supercross national champion], winning the titles in 1989, 1990 and 1992.

Biography
Stanton was born in Coldwater, Michigan to Erwin and Mary Stanton. Stanton rode for Honda for the better part of his career, earning all of his championships with them. Before team Honda, he rode a Yamaha as a privateer.

Stanton retired from professional motocross in 1994. Jeff married Sara Knowles in 1992 and they had a daughter, Siana, in 1996 and a son, Toren, in 1999.

In 2000 he was inducted into the AMA Motorcycle Hall of Fame.

Following his retirement, JStanton worked with American Honda as a consultant where he trained the factory riders until he was laid off when the motorcycle industry went through a downturn. He also trained Justin Barcia on private contract from 2012 to 2014. Stanton remains active on the family farm that he grew up on and continues to ride in local races with his son.

Major Career Titles and Accomplishments

1985
-Florida Winter AM 250cc Champion
-Florida Winter AM 500cc Champion
-NMA 250cc Amateur Champion
-NMA 500cc Amateur Champion
-AMA 250cc Amateur Champion
-AMA 500cc Amateur Champion
 
1986
-CMC 250 Trans-Cal Champion
-CMC 500 Trans-Cal Champion
 
1987
-AMA Pro Rookie of the Year
 
1989
-AMA 250 Supercross Champion 
-AMA 250 National Motocross Champion 
-Team USA Motocross des Nations (MXDN) Championship Team Member 
-Mickey Thompson Award of Excellence
 
1990
-AMA 250 Supercross Champion 
-AMA 250 National Motocross Champion 
-Team USA MXDN Championship Team Member 
-AMA Pro Athlete of the Year. 
-FIM Masters of Motocross Series Champion
 
1991
-Team USA MXDN Championship Team Member
 
1992
-AMA 250 Supercross Champion 
-AMA 250 National Motocross Champion 
-World Supercross Champion
 
1994
-Retired at end of Season to become Team Honda Consultant
 
2000
-Inducted into Motorcycle Hall of Fame

2002
-Inducted into Red Bud Track & Trail Hall of Fame
 
2006
-Inducted into Daytona International Speedway Hall of Fame
-Red Bud Grass Race - XR single shock class winner
-Red Bud Grass Race - XR dual shock class winner
 
2008
-Mickey Thompson Award of Excellence

References

External links
 Jeff Stanton at the AMA Motorcycle Hall of Fame

1968 births
Living people
Sportspeople from Michigan
American motocross riders
AMA Motocross Championship National Champions
People from Coldwater, Michigan